Akhtyrsky is an urban locality (urban-type settlement) in Abinsky District of Krasnodar Krai, Russia. Population:

References

Notes

Sources

Urban-type settlements in Krasnodar Krai
Abinsky District